Flávio da Silva Ramos (born 12 May 1994) is a Brazilian professional footballer who plays as a defender for Portuguese club Paços de Ferreira.

Club career
On 14 July 2021, Ramos signed a two-year contract with Paços de Ferreira.

References

1994 births
Sportspeople from Pernambuco
Living people
Association football defenders
Brazilian footballers
Clube Náutico Capibaribe players
C.D. Feirense players
Gençlerbirliği S.K. footballers
F.C. Paços de Ferreira players
Campeonato Pernambucano players
Campeonato Brasileiro Série B players
Primeira Liga players
Süper Lig players
Brazilian expatriate footballers
Expatriate footballers in Portugal
Expatriate footballers in Turkey
Brazilian expatriate sportspeople in Portugal
Brazilian expatriate sportspeople in Turkey